Theodosius I Borradiotes (b. Antioch – d. after 1183 in Constantinople) was the Ecumenical Patriarch of Constantinople from 1179 to 1183.

References

1183 deaths
12th-century patriarchs of Constantinople
People from Antioch
Year of birth unknown
Officials of Manuel I Komnenos